Mere is the first live album by Norwegian rock band deLillos.

Track listing
"Glemte minner"
"Suser avgårde alle mann"
"Den feite mannen"
"Søvn"
"Finnes det en kvinne"
"Beibi"
"Hjernen er alene"
"Nei ikke gjør det"
"Søster"
"Tøff i pysjamas"
"Avismannen"
"Arne"
"Nitten åttifire"
"Kokken Tor"
"Stole på"
"Venter på telefon"
"Vår"
"Balladen om Kåre og Nelly"
"Sveve over byen"
"Neste sommer"
"Johnny Fredrik"
"Stakkars Oslo"
"Utkaster"
"Min beibi dro avsted"

1994 live albums
DeLillos albums
Sonet Records albums